Who Goes There! is a 1952 British comedy film directed by Anthony Kimmins and starring Nigel Patrick, Valerie Hobson and George Cole. The film depicts the farcical activities of the various inhabitants of a grace and favour house near St James's Palace in Central London.

Production
It is based on a 1950 play of the same title by John Dighton, who also wrote the screenplay. It was shot at Shepperton Studios with some location filming around the Palace in London. The film's sets were designed by the art director Wilfred Shingleton.

Sidney Gilliat claims that Alexander Korda directed the film but gave credit to someone else.

It was retitled The Passionate Sentry for its United States release with American censors removing two uses of the word "Cripes!".

A version of Who Goes There! was broadcast on the BBC Radio Saturday Night Theatre on 20 March 1954.

Cast
 Nigel Patrick as Miles Cornwall
 Valerie Hobson as Alex Cornwall
 George Cole as Guardsman Arthur Crisp
 Peggy Cummins as Christina Deed
 Anthony Bushell as Major Guy Ashley
 A. E. Matthews as Sir Hubert Cornwall
 Joss Ambler as Tour Guide

References

External links

1952 films
1952 comedy films
British black-and-white films
British comedy films
British films based on plays
Films directed by Anthony Kimmins
Guards Division (United Kingdom)
Films set in London
Films shot in London
Films shot at Shepperton Studios
Military humor in film
1950s English-language films
1950s British films
Fictional soldiers